Rogan josh (also roghan josh, roghan ghosht, rogan gosht) is a Kashmiri curried lamb dish.

Rogan Josh or Rogan Gosh may also refer to:

 Rogan Josh (horse) (born 1992), an Australian racehorse
 Rogan Josh, a 2018 short fiction film, which won 'Best Short Film' at the 2018 Filmfare Awards
 Rogan Josh Curry, a fictional character from the 2011 British television sitcom White Van Man
 Rogan Gosh (comics), a British comic book story arc from 2000 A.D. comics republished in Dark Horse Comics
 Rogan Gosh, a character from the comic book story arc Rogan Gosh
 Rogan Gosh, a graphic novel collection of the story arc Rogan Gosh

See also 

 Josh Rogan, nom-de-plume of U.S. screenwriter Melissa Mathison (1950–2015)
 
 Rogan
 Ghosht
 Josh (disambiguation)